Waves of Visual Decay is the second studio album by the Norwegian progressive/power metal band Communic.

Track listing

Personnel
Communic
 Oddleif Stensland – lead vocals, lead guitar, rhythm guitar
 Erik Mortensen – bass
 Tor Atle Andersen – drums

Additional musicians
 Endre Kirkesola – keyboards

Production
 Recorded, mixed, and mastered by Jacob Hansen at Hansen Studios, Denmark.

Technical information
Artwork by Anthony Clarkson of The Mind's I.

References

2006 albums
Communic albums
Albums produced by Jacob Hansen